The brown moray eel, Gymnothorax unicolor, is a moray eel found in the eastern Atlantic Ocean and Mediterranean. It was first named by Delaroche in 1809.

Distribution
The brown moray eel is found in the Eastern Atlantic Ocean (in the coast of Portugal, in all the archipelagos of Macaronesia and Ascension Island) and on the Mediterranean.

References

External links
 

unicolor
Fish described in 1809
Taxa named by François-Étienne de La Roche